Leigh-Pemberton House is a historic house located on Castle Square in Lincoln, England, located on Bailgate between Lincoln Cathedral and Lincoln Castle. It became a Grade II* listed building on 8 October 1953. It is a half-timbered Tudor house, originally built for a merchant in 1543. A bank from 1899 until 1979, it was eventually given to the city of Lincoln by the Chairman of the National Westminster Bank, Sir Robin Leigh-Pemberton, (later governor of the Bank of England). It underwent extensive restoration in 1929 and 1970.

References

Houses completed in 1543
Houses in Lincolnshire
Buildings and structures in Lincoln, England
Timber framed buildings in England
Tudor architecture
Grade II* listed buildings in Lincolnshire
1543 establishments in England
NatWest Group